Emer Patten is an Irish film producer of primarily live music performances.

Career
In 1997 Patten co-founded boutique film production company Splinter Films - with long-term business partner Nick Wickham - where she works as Executive Producer, covering live events on multiple platforms including cinema, TV, 3D, DVD and online digital.

She previously worked for MTV Europe and has worked extensively with some of the world's best-known musical artists, including Madonna, Rihanna, Beyoncé, Metallica, Foo Fighters, The Cure, Katy Perry and Red Hot Chili Peppers. As well as her experience with major rock, pop and indie acts she has also produced films for many big-name Latin music artists in recent years, resulting in two Latin Grammy nominations for Best Long Form Music Video; once in 2012 for her work with Shakira and then again in 2014 for her work with Carlos Santana

Patten was invited back to her former university, Dublin City University, to give a TEDx talk in 2014, speaking on the topics of music film-making and activism, her presentation was titled 'A Passionate Engagement, When Music Film-making & Activism Overlap'. During this talk, Patten also touched upon her influences and drive to use her expertise in the music industry to engage in activism and political issues through her early associations with charities such as War Child & Greenpeace and events including Chime for Change and Live 8.

Production credits

References

External links

Splinter Films 

Living people
Irish film producers
Year of birth missing (living people)